Skibo Castle (Scottish Gaelic: Caisteal Sgìobail) is located to the west of Dornoch in the Highland county of Sutherland, Scotland overlooking the Dornoch Firth. Although largely of the 19th century and early 20th century, when it was the home of industrialist Andrew Carnegie, its origins go back much earlier. Andrew Chirnside was a previous owner.

It is now operated as The Carnegie Club, a members-only residential club, offering members and their guests accommodation in both the castle and estate lodges, a private links golf course and a range of activities including clay pigeon shooting, tennis and horse riding.

Etymology
According to William J. Watson, Skibo is the anglicisation of Scottish Gaelic Sgìobal, which in turn comes from an Old Norse name meaning either firewood-steading or Skithi's steading.

History
The first record of Skibo Castle is a charter from 1211. From its early history, the castle was a residence of the Bishops of Caithness. Skibo Castle remained the residence of subsequent bishops until 1545, when the estate was, as a tactical measure by the church, given to John Gray in order to reinforce its alliance with a powerful family as the threat of a Protestant uprising spread towards the north.

In 1745, Robert Gray surrendered the estate. It was later bought by a relative who built a modern house before 1760. Its ownership changed frequently until 1872, when it was bought by Evan Charles Sutherland-Walker, who extended the house and improved the grounds. However, the condition of the building had declined by 1897, when wealthy industrialist Andrew Carnegie took a one-year lease, with an option to buy. In 1898 he exercised that option for £85,000. Carnegie employed Alexander Ross of Inverness to carry out major upgrading works including full electrical services served by a private power station.

Skibo stayed with the Carnegie family until 1982. It was later purchased by businessman Peter de Savary and used as the foundation of a private members club, The Carnegie Club. Establishment of the club required restoration of the castle to recreate the luxury of an Edwardian sporting estate. Similar renovation was undertaken on the many lodges located amongst the castle grounds to provide additional accommodation for club members. De Savary sold the club to Ellis Short in 2003, for £23 million. Following the Shorts' purchase of the club, some £20 million has been invested in the refurbishment and restoration of the 8,000 acre estate. Aware of the historic significance of the category-A listed castle and its contents, the Club have undertaken a programme of conservation over the last decade with the aim of preserving as much as possible of the building whilst improving the existing facilities on the estate. This includes the redevelopment of the golf course, a sympathetic restoration of Carnegie's magnificent swimming pool, ongoing restoration of the Mackenzie and Moncur glasshouses and the refurbishment of all bedrooms in the castle and lodges.

The Carnegie Club

The Carnegie Club is a members-only club, with its accommodation and facilities available to its members and their guests. Non-members who wish to be considered for membership are invited to apply to the club's committee for a one-off visit before deciding whether to apply or not.

The Carnegie links golf course has fewer than 4000 rounds played on it per annum. As it is so quiet, residents of the club do not need to book tee times and can play whenever they wish. A limited number of public tee times are available to non-members/non-residents throughout the summer from May to October.

The funds raised from membership fees and accommodation are reinvested into the upkeep of the estate.

The Carnegie Club hosted Madonna's wedding to Guy Ritchie on 22 December 2000. In 1995, it had hosted the marriage of golfer Sam Torrance and actress Suzanne Danielle. On 28 December 1997 it hosted the marriage of actor Robert Carlyle and Anastasia Shirley.

On 3 December 2006, the BBC Television programme Landward featured the Burnett family who for several generations had been tenants of a farm on Skibo estate. The programme highlighted their search for a new farm following their eviction by the estate. The farmhouse is now part of guest accommodation on the estate.

Castle grounds
The grounds include Lake Louise, a very small artificial lake, and one of only a few bodies of water in Scotland known as lakes. The estate is listed on the Inventory of Gardens and Designed Landscapes in Scotland, the list of nationally significant designed landscapes.

References

External links
The Carnegie Club at Skibo Castle 
Skibo Estate, Gazetteer for Scotland

Castles in Highland (council area)
Category A listed buildings in Highland (council area)
Scottish baronial architecture
Andrew Carnegie
Inventory of Gardens and Designed Landscapes
Listed castles in Scotland
Buildings and structures in Sutherland
Carnegie family residences